The 1999–2000 Élite Ligue season was the 79th season of the Élite Ligue, the top level of ice hockey in France. Nine teams participated in the league, and Hockey Club de Reims won their first league title.

Regular season

Playoffs

External links
Season on hockeyarchives.info

France
1999–2000 in French ice hockey
Ligue Magnus seasons